Penrose Peak is a mountain in the Coeur d'Alene Mountains of the Rocky Mountains in Montana, United States.

References

Mountains of Montana
Rocky Mountains
Mountains of Sanders County, Montana